Takashi Furuya (born February 13, 1936 in Tokyo) is a Japanese jazz saxophonist and vocalist.

Furuya played violin and clarinet in his youth, and picked up saxophone as a teenager. He played on American military bases in the 1950s and led his own bands starting in 1959. These ensembles had several names, including Takashi Furuya and the Freshmen, The Concord, Reunion, the Neighborhood Big Band, and Neo Sax Band. He accompanied visiting American musicians on tours of Japan, including Dizzy Gillespie, Mal Waldron, and Phil Woods. He has worked as a sideman for Gil Evans, Naosuke Miyamoto, and Makoto Ozone, and also collaborated with Fumio Karashima, Kiyoshi Kitagawa, and Rikiya Higashihara.

References
Kazunori Sugiyama, "Takashi Furuya". The New Grove Dictionary of Jazz. 2nd edition, ed. Barry Kernfeld, 2004.

Japanese jazz saxophonists
Japanese jazz singers
Singers from Tokyo
20th-century saxophonists
21st-century saxophonists
1936 births
Living people
20th-century Japanese male singers
20th-century Japanese singers
21st-century Japanese male singers
21st-century Japanese singers
Male jazz musicians